Nicholas A. Mattiello (born 1963) is an American politician and  Democratic former member of the Rhode Island House of Representatives, who represented the 15th District from 2007 to 2021. He served as the Speaker of the Rhode Island House of Representatives from March 25, 2014 to 2021. In 2020, he was defeated in an upset by Republican Barbara Ann Fenton-Fung, the wife of Cranston mayor Allan Fung.

Political positions
Mattiello has been described as an "old-guard conservative." In 2011, he voted for Rhode Island's voter ID law. Despite his generally conservative profile, he voted for marriage equality in 2013. Mattiello has also expressed the fact that he does not support the bill relating to the Pawtucket Red Sox that was passed in the Senate in January 2018 and states that it was dead. He has expressed his disinterest in the idea of the taxpayer's money funding the new stadium, leading to the team to look outside of Rhode Island. He has been endorsed by Right to Life and the National Rifle Association.

In 2018, Mattiello sponsored legislation commonly known as "Kristen's Law" that allows life sentencing for anyone who sells, delivers or distributes an illegal drug that leads to a fatal overdose.

In July 2018, the Rhode Island Democratic Party, controlled by Mattiello, endorsed a pro-Trump candidate's primary challenge against incumbent Rep. Moira Walsh, who had voiced her disapproval with Mattiello on previous occasions.

In June 2019, Mattiello attempted to include $1 million in the R.I. budget to be allocated to a single chiropractor, Victor Pedro, despite R.I.'s Medicaid Medical Care Advisory Committee stating that "there wasn’t evidence that the treatment worked." Eventually, Mattiello pulled support for the bill due to public and political pressure.

In June 2020, during the campaign to remove "Plantations" from the official state name of Rhode Island, Mattiello received criticism for not knowing what the holiday Juneteenth commemorated, and making the statement that he "did not think we had actual slavery in Rhode Island." Rhode Island ships were the center of the Transatlantic Slave Trade, importing more enslaved Africans than any other North American British colony.

References

External links
Rhode Island House - Representative Nicholas A. Mattiello, official R.I. House website

|-

1963 births
21st-century American politicians
Politicians from Cranston, Rhode Island
Living people
Rhode Island lawyers
Speakers of the Rhode Island House of Representatives
Democratic Party members of the Rhode Island House of Representatives